Save the Green Planet! (Korean title: 지구를 지켜라!, Jigureul Jikyeora!) is a South Korean science fiction comedy film written and directed by Jang Joon-hwan, released on 4 April 2003. The basic story begins when the main character, Lee Byeong-gu, kidnaps another man, convinced that the latter is an alien.

Plot
The film's main character is Byeong-gu, a man who believes that aliens from Andromeda PK 45 are about to attack Earth and that he is the only one who can prevent them. With his childlike circus-performer girlfriend Su-ni, he kidnaps a powerful pharmaceutical executive Kang man shik whom he believes to be a top ranking extraterrestrial able to contact the Andromedan prince during the upcoming eclipse. After imprisoning the man in his basement workshop, Byeong-gu proceeds to torture him(he initially attempts to nullify the alien's transmitters using a korean liquid painkiller mulpas(물파스), which contains chlorpheniramine maleate and a "Italy towel" used by korean   Ttaemiris.)

It soon seemingly appears that the executive's company poisoned Byeong-gu's mother in a pharmaceuticals test, and that it is vengeance fueled psychosis that causes Byeong-gu to believe the executive is an alien.

When a detective comes calling to investigate the disappearance, the executive tries to escape but is thwarted by Byeong-gu. The detective at first finds nothing unusual thanks to Byeong-guy’s attempt to hide it, but on his way out sees Byeong-gu's dog (appropriately named Earth) gnawing on the leg bones of his master's past victims. After contacting a partner in the police force he is killed by Byeong-gu's bees, then hacked up and fed to the dog. Byeong-gu then crucifies the executive and breaks his leg with the back of his axe, to punish him for his attempted escape. In a desperate move, the executive convinces Byeong-gu that the bottle of benzene in his car trunk is the antidote for his comatose mother.

As Byeong-gu races to the hospital to deliver the antidote, the executive frees himself by pulling his hands through the nails. He then travels deeper into his captor’s lair, finding evidence of his grim research. Photos of mutilated corpses are littered with blood scrawled notebooks, while hands and brains of past ‘subjects’ reside in jars. Reading through the journals, the executive discovers Byeong-gu's traumatic past: his father was a coal miner who lost one of his arms due to his dangerous work and was killed by his wife when he attempted to attack her and his son. The child was beaten in school and was a victim of the sadistic whims of his cruel teachers. He showed early signs of violence, such as stabbing a fellow school mate with a kitchen knife. His mother was then poisoned in the aforementioned incident and at a protest his former girlfriend was beaten to death. He slowly went mad from the violence that surrounded him.

As this is happening, the dead detective's partner arrives and finds the frantic executive. And Byeong-gu, after desperately rushing to the hospital to give the 'antidote' to his comatose mother, killing her, becomes ever more enraged. He returns home to kill the alien, only to find the detective there as well.  After a brief struggle and a bizarre turn of events, he captures both of them and plans on killing them both.  The frantic executive then admits to being an alien and proceeds to spin an outlandish tale which stretches back to the time of the dinosaurs(the story heavily inspired from the biblical story and parodies scenes from the 2001:Space Odyssey), about how his race was originally trying to save humanity from a suicide gene(that leads to killing a member of their own species) by experimenting on the genetic code of his mother. He also agrees(while realizing the story might be based on the alien research notes he read about), in what appears to be a time-buying move, to contact the alien prince at the pharmaceutical company factory.

Byeong-gu leaves the detective all his notes, saying that if he does not make it, he will have the responsibility of saving the planet. At the factory, the executive triggers a computer controlled robotic arm to kill Byeong-gu's girlfriend, and after a long struggle, he beats his captor almost to death. When the police arrive, they shoot Byeong-gu, and as he bleeds to death he wonders aloud, "Now who will save the earth?"

When the aliens do arrive and beam up the executive aboard their ship, we learn he is in fact the alien king himself. Disgusted and angered by the torture and corruption and evils of the world, he deems Earth a failed experiment and blasts it from creation. As the credits roll still photographs recap the entire journey of Byeong-gu's life, focusing instead on the beautiful, happy moments of a young boy and man with his father and mother and girlfriend.

Cast

Production
Jang first conceived of the idea for Save the Green Planet! while watching the film Misery. He enjoyed it, but was disappointed with the lack of depth of the Annie Wilkes character, and accordingly decided that if he made a film about a kidnapping, it would be staged from the point of view of the kidnapper. Later, Jang stumbled across a crank website accusing actor Leonardo DiCaprio of being an alien who wanted to conquer Earth by seducing all of its women, and he decided to combine the two concepts.

Remake
In May 2020, it was announced that CJ Entertainment would be producing an English-language remake of the cult film with film-making duo Ari Aster and Lars Knudsen, whose credits include Midsommar and Hereditary.

Awards and nominations
Blue Dragon Film Awards
Best Supporting Actor: Baek Yoon-sik
Best New Director: Jang Joon-hwan

Brussels International Fantastic Film Festival
Golden Raven Award

Buenos Aires International Festival of Independent Cinema
Best Actress: Hwang Jeong-min
ADF Cinematography Award

Director's Cut Awards
Best New Director: Jang Joon-hwan

Grand Bell Awards
Best Supporting Actor: Baek Yoon-sik
Best New Director: Jang Joon-hwan
Best Sound

Korean Film Awards
Best Supporting Actor: Baek Yoon-sik
Best New Director: Jang Joon-hwan

25th Moscow International Film Festival
Nomination - Golden Saint George
Silver Saint George

Puchon International Fantastic Film Festival
Best of Puchon

Busan Film Critics Awards
Best Film
Best Actor: Shin Ha-kyun
Best New Director: Jang Joon-hwan

International Film Festival Rotterdam
KNF Award Special Mention

Notes

External links 
 
 

2003 films
2003 black comedy films
South Korean science fiction comedy films
South Korean black comedy films
2000s science fiction comedy films
2000s Korean-language films
2003 directorial debut films
2003 comedy films
2000s South Korean films